

See also
 Graphic adventure game
 Visual novel
 Adventure game
 Interactive fiction

References

Graphic adventure games
Adventure games